Bouchercon is an annual convention of creators and devotees of mystery and detective fiction. It is named in honour of writer, reviewer, and editor Anthony Boucher; also the inspiration for the Anthony Awards, which have been issued at the convention since 1986. This page details Bouchercon XVIII and the 2nd Anthony Awards ceremony.

Bouchercon
The convention was held in Minneapolis, Minnesota on October 9, 1987; running for two days until the 11th. The event was chaired by authors Steven A. Stilwell and Becky A. Reineke.

Special Guests
Guest of Honor — Lawrence Block
Fan Guest of Honor — John Nieminski (posthumously)
Toastmasters — Mary S. Craig & Max Allan Collins

Anthony Awards
The following list details the awards distributed at the second annual Anthony Awards ceremony.

Novel award
Winner:
Sue Grafton, "C" is for Corpse

Shortlist:
Lawrence Block, When the Sacred Ginmill Closes
John Lutz, Tropical Heat
Nancy Pickard, No Body
Jonathan Valin, Life's Work

First novel award
Winner:
Bill Crider, Too Late to Die

Shortlist:
Joan Hess, Strangled Prose
Faye Kellerman, The Ritual Bath
Joseph Koenig, Floater
Mike Lupica, Dead Air

Paperback original award
Winner:
Robert Wright Campbell, The Junkyard Dog

Shortlist:
Lilian Jackson Braun, The Cat Who Saw Red
J.A. Jance, Trial By Fury
Rob Kantner, The Back-Door Man
Warren Murphy, Trace: Too Old a Cat

Short story award
Winner:
Sue Grafton, "The Parker Shotgun", from Mean streets: The Second Private Eye Writers of America Anthology

Shortlist:
Wayne D. Dundee, "Body Count", from Mean streets: The Second Private Eye Writers of America Anthology
Clark Howard, "Scalplock", from Ellery Queen's Mystery Magazine July 1986

References

Anthony Awards
18
1987 in Minnesota